Inquisitor multilirata is a species of sea snail, a marine gastropod mollusk in the family Pseudomelatomidae.

This species is considered a nomen dubium by Tucker in his "Catalog of recent and fossil turrids".

Description

Distribution
This marine species is endemic to Australia and occurs off New South Wales.

References

 Smith, E.A. 1877. Diagnoses of new species of Pleurotomidae in the British Museum. Annals and Magazine of Natural History 4 19: 488–501
 Hedley, C. 1922. A revision of the Australian Turridae. Records of the Australian Museum 13(6): 213–359, pls 42–56 
 Laseron, C. 1954. Revision of the New South Wales Turridae (Mollusca). Australian Zoological Handbook. Sydney : Royal Zoological Society of New South Wales 1–56, pls 1–12.

External links
  Hedley, C. 1903. Scientific results of the trawling expedition of H.M.C.S. "Thetis" off the coast of New South Wales in February and March, 1898, pt. 6. Memoirs of the Australian Museum 4(1): 326–402

multilirata
Gastropods of Australia
Gastropods described in 1877